The F.-C. Weiskopf-Preis is a German literary prize. It was established in 1957.

References

German literary awards
Awards established in 1957
1957 establishments in Germany